A Social Celebrity is a 1926 American silent comedy drama film directed by Malcolm St. Clair and starred Louise Brooks as a small town manicurist who goes to New York City with her boyfriend (Adolphe Menjou), a barber who poses as a French count. The film is now considered lost.

Plot
Max Haber (Menjou), a small town barber, is the pride of his father, Johann (Chester Conklin), who owns an antiquated barbershop. Max adores Kitty Laverne (Brooks), the manicurist, who loves him but aspires to be a dancer and leaves for New York City, hoping that he will follow in pursuit of better things.

Mrs. Jackson-Greer (Josephine Drake), a New York society matron, has occasion to note Max fashioning the hair of a town girl and induces him to come to New York and pose as a French count. There he meets April (Elsie Lawson), Mrs. King's niece, and loses his heart to her, as well as to Kitty, now a showgirl. At the theater where Kitty is appearing, Max is the best-dressed man in April's party. At a nightclub later that night, Max's true identity is revealed, and he is deserted by his society friends. Disillusioned, Max returns home at the request of his father. Kitty follows, realizing that he needs her.

Cast
 Adolphe Menjou as Max Haber
 Louise Brooks as Kitty Laverne
 Eleanor Lawson as April King (credited as Elsie Lawson)
 Roger Davis as Tenny
 Hugh Huntley as Forrest Abbott
 Chester Conklin as Johann Haber
 Freeman Wood as Gifford Jones
 Josephine Drake as Mrs. Jackson-Greer
 Ida Waterman as Mrs. Winifred King

Production
The film was produced by Famous Players-Lasky Corporation and distributed by Paramount Pictures. A Social Celebrity began production in December 1925 with Greta Nissen in the lead role. Louise Brooks was also cast in a supporting role but was recast in the lead after Nissen left the project.

Preservation
Prints of A Social Celebrity still existed up until the 1950s. One print was preserved at the George Eastman House where Louise Brooks viewed it in 1957. That print has since deteriorated. The last known print of the film was preserved at the Cinémathèque Française, but was destroyed in a vault fire on July 10, 1959. No prints of the film are known to exist and A Social Celebrity is now considered lost.

See also
List of lost films

References

External links
 
 

1926 films
1926 comedy-drama films
1920s English-language films
American silent feature films
American black-and-white films
Famous Players-Lasky films
Films directed by Malcolm St. Clair
Films set in New York City
Lost American films
Paramount Pictures films
1926 lost films
Lost comedy-drama films
1920s American films
Silent American comedy-drama films